Renate Hjortland is a Norwegian Paralympic skier. She represented Norway in para-alpine skiing at the 1992 Winter Paralympic Games in France, and 1994 Winter Paralympic Games  in Norway. She won a total of four medals, including three silver medals and one bronze medal.

Career 
At the 1992 Winter Paralympics, in Tignes Albertville, Hjortland placed 3rd in the super-G LW3,4,9 with a time of 1: 20.93. In 1st place Reinhild Möller who finished the race in 1: 12.41 and in 2nd place Lana Spreeman in 1:19.63. 

At the 1994 Winter Paralympics, in Lillehammer, Hjortland won three silver medals: in the giant slalom LW3 / 4 in 2:49.65 (gold for the German athlete Reinhild Möller in 2: 33.06 and bronze for the Canadian Lana Spreeman in 2: 59.73), downhill LW3 / 4 in 1:18.96 (1st place Reinhild Möller with a time of 1: 16.90 and 3rd place Lana Spreeman with 1: 18.99), and super-G LW3 / 4 in 1:16.08 (on the podium Reinhild Möller, in first position with a time of 1:12.05 and Lana Spreeman, third with 1: 19.15  ).

References 

Living people
Paralympic alpine skiers of Norway
Norwegian female alpine skiers
Alpine skiers at the 1992 Winter Paralympics
Alpine skiers at the 1994 Winter Paralympics
Medalists at the 1992 Winter Paralympics
Medalists at the 1994 Winter Paralympics
Paralympic silver medalists for Norway
Paralympic bronze medalists for Norway
Date of birth missing (living people)
Place of birth missing (living people)